Asghar Zaidi is a social policy analyst and population ageing researcher. He is the 4th and current Vice Chancellor and 31st head of the Government College University Lahore (GCU), serving since October 2019. Previously, he served as the Professor of Social Gerontology at Seoul National University, South Korea.

Biography 

Asghar Zaidi attended the Government College University, Lahore (1981 to 1984) from where he obtained his bachelor's degree in Mathematics, Statistics and Economics (First Division). He did his Master in Economics (1985–1987) from Quaid-i-Azam University, Islamabad. In 1988, he moved to Netherlands from where he obtained his master's degree in Development Studies (Economic Policy and Planning) with Distinction in Thesis from the International Institute of Social Studies. He obtained his PhD Degree (1997–2004) in Economics from the University of Oxford, UK under the guidance of Tony Atkinson.

Research, honours and awards 

Asghar Zaidi's research interests are Population ageing and its social and economic consequences, pension policy and its impact on fiscal and social sustainability of welfare states, Labour Market status and well-being of persons with disabilities, Poverty and social exclusion among older people and Dynamic microsimulation model. He has worked as a researcher in many top organizations and Institutes across the World including University of Oxford, Erasmus University Rotterdam, London School of Economics and many more. He has received many Awards and Grants to carry out the Research Projects.

The Government of Shanghai has awarded him the 1,000 Foreign Experts Scholarship in 2019.

Publications

Books 
 Building Evidence for Active Ageing Policies Active Ageing Index and its Potential with A.O., Harper, S., Howse, K., Lamura, G., Perek-Białas, Basingstoke, UK, 2018.
 Ageing, Health and Pensions in Europe: An Economic and Social Policy Perspective with L. Bovenberg and A. van Soest, Basingstoke, UK, 2010.
 New Frontiers in Microsimulation Modelling, with Ann Harding and Paul Williamson, Surrey, UK, 2009.
 Well-Being of Older People in Ageing Societies, Surrey, UK, 2008.
 Mainstreaming Ageing: Indicators to Monitor Sustainable Progress and Policies with Bernd Marin, Surrey, UK 2007.

Journalistic articles 
 "Dementia challenges in Pakistan: A case study of low and middle-income country", 27 February 2019
 "Which countries make the most of their older people?", 11 May 2015
 "Which is the best country to grow old in?", 26 November 2014

References

External links 
 Asghar Zaidi Web Page

Alumni of the University of Oxford
Vice-Chancellors of the University of the Punjab
Living people
Year of birth missing (living people)
Government College University, Lahore alumni
Pakistani economists